Oreoleuciscus is a genus of medium to large cyprinid freshwater fish which is only found in Mongolia and adjacent parts of Russia.

Species
There are currently four recognized species in this genus:
 Oreoleuciscus angusticephalus Bogutskaya, 2001 (Narrow-headed Altai osman)
 Oreoleuciscus dsapchynensis Warpachowski, 1889
 Oreoleuciscus humilis Warpachowski, 1889 (Dwarf Altai osman)
 Oreoleuciscus potanini (Kessler, 1879) (Altai osman)

References

Cyprinid fish of Asia
Cyprinidae genera